Shadow from Ladakh is a novel by Bhabani Bhattacharya first published in 1966 by Crown Publishers. The book is set with the Sino-Indian War as a backdrop and tackles various issues include China's presence in Tibet as well the more local social and moral elements of life. The mixture of humour and interactions of the characters in a war setting provides the novel a nuanced approach.

The book won the Sahitya Akademi Award in 1967.

References

Bibliography

1966 novels
Novels set in India
Sahitya Akademi Award-winning works